Northington is a village and civil parish in the City of Winchester district of Hampshire, England. It lies half a mile from the neighbouring village, Swarraton. Its nearest railway station is at New Alresford, on the Mid-Hants railway line.

References

See also
The Grange, Northington

Villages in Hampshire